The 2012–13 season was Sampdoria's 66th in existence. Sampdoria finished the 2011–12 season in sixth place in Serie B and were promoted to Serie A through the play-offs.

Players

Current squad

Matches

Legend

Serie A

Squad statistics

Appearances and goals

|-
! colspan="10" style="background:#dcdcdc; text-align:center"| Goalkeepers

|-
! colspan="10" style="background:#dcdcdc; text-align:center"| Defenders

|-
! colspan="10" style="background:#dcdcdc; text-align:center"| Midfielders

|-
! colspan="10" style="background:#dcdcdc; text-align:center"| Forwards

|-
! colspan="10" style="background:#dcdcdc; text-align:center"| Players transferred out during the season

Top scorers
This includes all competitive matches.  The list is sorted by shirt number when total goals are equal.
{| class="wikitable sortable" style="font-size: 95%; text-align: center;"
|-
!width=15|
!width=15|
!width=15|
!width=15|
!width=150|Name
!width=80|Serie A
!width=80|Coppa Italia
!width=80|Total
|-
|1
|98
|FW
|
|Mauro Icardi
|10
|0
|10
|-
|2
|23
|FW
|
|Éder
|7
|0
|7
|-
|3
|10
|FW
|
|Maxi López
|4
|1
|5
|-
|4
|6
|MF
|
|Enzo Maresca
|3
|0
|3
|-
|=
|11
|MF
|
|Gianni Munari
|3
|0
|3
|-
|=
|16
|MF
|
|Andrea Poli
|3
|0
|3
|-
|7
|
|
|
|Own goals
|2
|0
|2
|-
|=
|2
|MF
|
|Marcelo Estigarribia
|2
|0
|2
|-
|=
|12
|FW
|
|Gianluca Sansone
|2
|0
|2
|-
|=
|19
|DF
|
|Lorenzo De Silvestri
|2
|0
|2
|-
|11
|3
|DF
|
|Andrea Costa
|1
|0
|1
|-
|=
|9
|FW
|
|Nicola Pozzi
|1
|0
|1
|-
|=
|14
|MF
|
|Pedro Obiang
|1
|0
|1
|-
|=
|25
|MF
|
|Nenad Krstičić
|1
|0
|1
|-
|=
|28
|DF
|
|Daniele Gastaldello
|1
|0
|1

Sources

Sampdoria
U.C. Sampdoria seasons